Albert Ndele Bamu (born 15 August 1930) is a Congolese politician and banker. He served as chairman of the College of Commissioners-General that governed the Republic of the Congo (Léopoldville) for two weeks while Justin Marie Bomboko returned from New York to Léopoldville, and the next four months as deputy chairman. He was later governor of the National Bank of the Congo from 1961 to 1970. He briefly served as the Minister of Finance. One term from September 1960 to February 1961, and another term from 15 September 1970 until his dismissal on 12 November 1970.

Citations

References 

Living people
Governors of the Banque Centrale du Congo
Prime Ministers of the Democratic Republic of the Congo
Finance ministers of the Democratic Republic of the Congo
1930 births
Catholic University of Leuven (1834–1968) alumni
Lovanium University alumni
People of the Congo Crisis
People from Kongo Central
21st-century Democratic Republic of the Congo people